Vysokopetrovsky Monastery (English: High Monastery of St Peter) is a Russian Orthodox monastery in the Bely Gorod area of Moscow, commanding a hill whence Petrovka Street descends towards the Kremlin.

The monastery is believed to have been founded around the 1320s by Saint Peter of Moscow, the first Russian metropolitan to have his see in Moscow. The cloister gave its name to adjacent Petrovka Street, one of the streets radiating from Red Square.

In the late 17th century, the Naryshkin boyars, maternal relatives of Peter the Great, turned the monastery into their family burial place. They had it reconstructed in the Naryshkin Baroque style of architecture associated with their name. In the mid-18th century, several subsidiary structures were added, possibly based on designs by Dmitry Ukhtomsky or Ivan Fyodorovich Michurin.

The katholikon, dedicated to St Peter of Moscow, was long regarded as a typical monument of the Naryshkin style and dated to 1692. In the 1970s, however, detailed studies of written sources and excavations of the site revealed that the katholikon actually had been built in 1514-1517 by Aloisio the New. 

After the monastery was closed down by the Soviet authorities in 1929, Archimandrite Bartholomew Remov arranged for the monks and nuns to continue their monastic life in secret at the Nativity Church at Putinki, where he was the Rector. The spiritual life of the monastery continued at Putinki until the NKVD was informed and arrested everyone involved in 1935. 

In 1992 several buildings of the monastery were returned to the Russian Orthodox Church. As of 2005, the buildings are shared by the Russian Orthodox Church and the Moscow Literature Museum.

Structures

 Cathedral of St Peter (1517).
 Church of Our Lady of Bogolyubovo (with a refectory) (1687)
 Church of St. Sergius of Radonezh (with a refectory) (1694)
 Church of St. Pachomius the Great above the monastery gates (1755)
 Church of the Tolga icon of the mother of God (1750)
 Church of the Intercession above the monastery gates, with a belltower. (1694)
 Church (former chapel) of Our Lady of Kazan (inside the former gates under the belltower).

References

External links
Vysokopetrovsky Monastery official web-site, in Russian

Monasteries in Moscow
Russian Orthodox monasteries in Russia
Religious organizations established in the 1320s
Christian monasteries established in the 14th century
14th-century establishments in Russia
Tverskoy District
Cultural heritage monuments of federal significance in Moscow